Common rail direct fuel injection is a direct fuel injection system built around a high-pressure (over ) fuel rail feeding solenoid valves, as opposed to a low-pressure fuel pump feeding unit injectors (or pump nozzles). High-pressure injection delivers power and fuel consumption benefits over earlier lower pressure fuel injection, by injecting fuel as a larger number of smaller droplets, giving a much higher ratio of surface area to volume. This provides improved vaporization from the surface of the fuel droplets, and so more efficient combining of atmospheric oxygen with vaporized fuel delivering more complete combustion.

Common rail injection is widely used in diesel engines. It is also the basis of gasoline direct injection systems used on petrol engines.

History

Vickers pioneered the use of common rail injection in submarine engines. Vickers engines with the common rail fuel system were first used in 1916 in the G-class submarines. It used four plunger pumps to deliver a pressure up to  every 90° of rotation to keep the fuel pressure adequately constant in the rail. Fuel delivery to individual cylinders could be shut off by valves in the injector lines. Pressure control was achieved by an adjustable pump discharge stroke and a "spill valve". Camshaft-operated mechanical timing valves were used to supply the spring-loaded Brice/CAV/Lucas injectors, which injected through the side of the cylinder into the chamber formed between the pistons. Early engines had a pair of timing cams, one for ahead running and one for astern. Later engines had two injectors per cylinder, and the final series of constant-pressure turbocharged engines was fitted with four injectors per cylinder. This system was used for the injection of both diesel and heavy fuel oil (600cSt heated to a temperature near 130 °C).

Common rail engines have been used in marine and locomotive applications for some time. The Cooper-Bessemer GN-8 (circa 1942) is an example of a hydraulically operated common rail diesel engine, also known as a modified common rail.

The common rail system prototype for automotive engines was developed in the late 1960s by Robert Huber of Switzerland, and the technology was further developed by Dr. Marco Ganser at the Swiss Federal Institute of Technology in Zurich, later of Ganser-Hydromag AG (est. 1995) in Oberägeri.

The first common-rail-Diesel-engine used in a road vehicle was the MN 106-engine by East German VEB IFA Motorenwerke Nordhausen. It was built into a single IFA W50 in 1985. Due to a lack of funding, the development was cancelled and mass production was never achieved.

The first successful use in a mass production vehicle began in Japan by the mid-1990s. Dr. Shohei Itoh and Masahiko Miyaki of the Denso Corporation, a Japanese automotive-parts manufacturer, developed the common rail fuel system for heavy-duty vehicles and turned it into practical use on their ECD-U2 common rail system mounted on the Hino Ranger truck and sold for general use in 1995. Denso claims the first commercial high-pressure common rail system in 1995.

Modern common rail systems, although working on the same principle, are governed by an engine control unit, which opens each injector electrically rather than mechanically. This was extensively prototyped in the 1990s with collaboration between Magneti Marelli, Centro Ricerche Fiat, and Elasis. After research and development by the Fiat Group, the design was acquired by the German company Robert Bosch GmbH for completion of development and refinement for mass production. In hindsight, the sale appeared to be a strategic error for Fiat, as the new technology proved to be highly profitable. The company had little choice but to sell Bosch a licence, as it was in a poor financial state at the time and lacked the resources to complete development on its own. In 1997, they extended its use for passenger cars. The first passenger car to use the common rail system was the 1997 model Alfa Romeo 156 with a 2.4-L JTD engine, and later that same year, Mercedes-Benz introduced it in their W202 model. In 2001, common rail made its way into pickup trucks with the 6.6 liter Duramax LB7 V8 used in Chevrolet Silverado and GMC Sierra HD models. Dodge and Cummins implemented this in 2003, and Ford adopted this technology in 2008 with the Navistar-built 6.4L Powerstroke. Today, all diesel pickup trucks use common rail systems.

Applications 
The common rail system is suitable for all types of road cars with diesel engines, ranging from city cars (such as the Fiat Panda) to executive cars (such as the Audi A8). The main suppliers of modern common rail systems are BOSCH, Delphi Technologies, Denso, and Siemens VDO (now owned by Continental AG).

Acronyms and branding used

The automotive manufacturers refer to their common rail engines by their own brand names:
 Ashok Leyland: CRS (used in U Truck and E4 Busses)
 Audi: TDI, BiTDi The "Bi" stands for BiTurbo
 BMW Group (BMW and Mini): d (also used in the Land Rover Freelander as TD4 and the Rover 75 and MG ZT as CDT and CDTi), D and SD
 Chevrolet (owned by GM): VCDi (licensed from VM Motori) and Duramax Diesel
 Chrysler CRD
 Citroën: HDi, e-HDi and BlueHDi
 Cummins and Scania: XPI (developed under joint venture)
 Cummins: CCR (Cummins pump with Bosch injectors)
 Daimler: CDI 
 Fiat Group (Fiat, Alfa Romeo and Lancia): JTD (also branded as MultiJet, JTDm, and by supplied manufacturers as TDi, CDTi, TCDi, TiD, TTiD, DDiS and QuadraJet)
 Ford Motor Company: TDCi (Duratorq and Powerstroke) and EcoBlue Diesel
 Honda: i-CTDI and i-DTEC
 Hyundai, Kia and Genesis: CRDi
 IKCO: EFD
 Isuzu: iTEQ, Ddi and DI TURBO
 Jaguar: d
 Jeep: CRD and EcoDiesel
 Komatsu: Tier3, Tier4, 4D95 and higher HPCR-series
 Land Rover: TD4, eD4, SD4, TD6, TDV6, SDV6, TDV8, SDV8
 Lexus: d (e.g. 450d and 220d)
 Mahindra: CRDe, m2DiCR, mEagle, mHawk, mFalcon and mPower (Trucks)
 Maserati: Diesel
 Mazda: MZR-CD and Skyactiv-D (are manufactured by the Ford and PSA Peugeot Citroën joint venture) and earlier DiTD
 Mercedes-Benz: CDI and d
 Mitsubishi: Di-D 
 Nissan: DDTi
 Opel/Vauxhall: DTI, CDTI, BiTurbo CDTI, CRI, Turbo D and BiTurbo D
 Porsche: Diesel
 Proton: SCDi
 Groupe PSA (Peugeot, Citroën and DS): HDi, e-HDi or BlueHDi (developed under joint venture with Ford) – See PSA HDi engine
 Renault, Dacia and Nissan: dCi and BLUEdCi (Infiniti uses some dCi engines as part of the Renault-Nissan Alliance, branded d)
 Saab: TiD (The 2.2 turbo diesel engine was also called "TiD", but it didn't have Common rail) and TTiD The double "T" stands for Twin-Turbo
 SsangYong: XDi, eXDI, XVT or D
 Subaru: TD, D or BOXER DIESEL (as of Jan 2008)
 Suzuki: DDiS
 Tata: 2.2 VTT DiCOR (used in large SUV-class such as Safari), VARICOR (used in large SUV-class such as Safari Storme, Aria and Hexa),1.05 Revotorq CR3 (used in Tiago and Tigor)  1.5 Revotorq CR05 (used in Nexon and Altroz), 1.4 CR4 (used in Indica, Indigo), 3.0 CR4 (used in Sumo gold) 1.3 Quadrajet (supplied by Fiat and used in Indica Vista, Indigo Manza and Zest), and 2.0 Kryotec (also supplied by Fiat and used in SUV Harrier and All new Safari),3.3 L Turbotronn and 5L Turbotronn ( used in M&HCV Trucks). 

 Toyota: D-4D and D-CAT
 Volkswagen Group (Volkswagen, Audi, SEAT and Škoda): TDI (more recent models use common rail, as opposed to the earlier unit injector engines). Bentley term their Bentayga diesel simply Diesel
 Volvo: D, D2, D3, D4 and D5 engines (some are manufactured by Ford and PSA Peugeot Citroën), Volvo Penta D-series engines

Principles

Solenoid or piezoelectric valves make possible fine electronic control over the fuel-injection time and quantity, and the higher pressure that the common rail technology makes available provides better fuel atomisation. To lower engine noise, the engine's electronic control unit can inject a small amount of diesel just before the main injection event ("pilot" injection), thus reducing its explosiveness and vibration, as well as optimising injection timing and quantity for variations in fuel quality, cold starting, and so on. Some advanced common rail fuel systems perform as many as five injections per stroke.

Common rail engines require a very short to no heating-up time, depending on the ambient temperature, and produce lower engine noise and emissions than older systems.

Diesel engines have historically used various forms of fuel injection. Two common types include the unit-injection system and the distributor/inline-pump systems. While these older systems provide accurate fuel quantity and injection timing control, they are limited by several factors:

They are cam driven, and injection pressure is proportional to engine speed. This typically means that the highest injection pressure can only be achieved at the highest engine speed and the maximum achievable injection pressure decreases as engine speed decreases. This relationship is true with all pumps, even those used on common rail systems. With unit or distributor systems, the injection pressure is tied to the instantaneous pressure of a single pumping event with no accumulator, thus the relationship is more prominent and troublesome.
They are limited in the number and timing of injection events that can be commanded during a single combustion event. While multiple injection events are possible with these older systems, it is much more difficult and costly to achieve.
For the typical distributor/inline system, the start of injection occurs at a predetermined pressure (often referred to as pop pressure) and ends at a predetermined pressure. This characteristic results from "dumb" injectors in the cylinder head which open and close at pressures determined by the spring preload applied to the plunger in the injector. Once the pressure in the injector reaches a predetermined level, the plunger lifts and injection starts.

In common rail systems, a high-pressure pump stores a reservoir of fuel at high pressure — up to and above . The term "common rail" refers to the fact that all of the fuel injectors are supplied by a common fuel rail which is nothing more than a pressure accumulator where the fuel is stored at high pressure. This accumulator supplies multiple fuel injectors with high-pressure fuel. This simplifies the purpose of the high-pressure pump in that it only needs to maintain a target pressure (either mechanically or electronically controlled). The fuel injectors are typically controlled by the engine control unit (ECU). When the fuel injectors are electrically activated, a hydraulic valve (consisting of a nozzle and plunger) is mechanically or hydraulically opened and fuel is sprayed into the cylinders at the desired pressure. Since the fuel pressure energy is stored remotely and the injectors are electrically actuated, the injection pressure at the start and end of injection is very near the pressure in the accumulator (rail), thus producing a square injection rate. If the accumulator, pump, and plumbing are sized properly, the injection pressure and rate will be the same for each of the multiple injection events.

See also
 Hydraulically actuated electronic unit injection
 Turbocharged direct injection
 Unit pump
 Water sensor

References

External links 

Common Rail Direct Injection System or CRDI System working and advanatages
Brief Summary about working of CRDI Engine
Animation explaining common rail functioning

Diesel engine technology
Engine fuel system technology

ja:噴射ポンプ#コモンレール式